Eupithecia honesta is a moth in the family Geometridae. It is found in China (the mountains along the border between Tibet and Yunnan).

The wingspan is about 19–22 mm. The forewings are pale orange brown and the hindwings are white.

References

Moths described in 2005
honesta
Moths of Asia